Isopotential muscle refers to muscle fibers which are fewer than two times the length constant.

References
 

Muscular system